"Superman"  is a 1977 novelty song written by Pepe Luis Soto. Celi Bee and the Buzzy Bunch originally recorded the song for their 1977 album of the same title.

The song narrowly missed the Top 40 on the Billboard Hot 100, peaking at No. 41. However, it was a Top 5 Disco hit, peaking at No. 3 on the Billboard Disco Action charts, along with the track "One Love".

Herbie Mann version
In 1978, Herbie Mann covered the song for his 1978 album Super Mann. It coincided with the release of the film of the same name.

Mann's cover is a Top 40 hit on the Billboard Hot 100, peaking at No. 26.

Chart performance
Celi Bee and the Buzzy Bunch

Herbie Mann

References

1977 singles
Disco songs
Novelty songs
1977 songs
Songs about comics
Songs about fictional male characters
Superman music
Superman in other media